Bolshiye Chapurniki is a rural locality (a selo) in Svetloyarsky District, Volgograd Oblast, Russia. The population was 3,228 as of 2010. There are 13 streets.

Geography 
Bolshiye Chapurniki is located 19 km southwest of Svetly Yar (the district's administrative centre) by road. Malye Chapurniki is the nearest rural locality.

References 

Rural localities in Svetloyarsky District